is a district located in Toyama Prefecture, Japan.

As of 2003, the district has an estimated population of 49,118 and a density of 77.09 persons per km2. The total area is 637.19 km2.

Towns and villages
The district has two towns:

 Asahi
 Nyūzen

History

Mergers
 On March 31, 2006 - The town of Unazuki merged with the old city of Kurobe to form the new city of Kurobe.

Districts in Toyama Prefecture